An orchid is a member of the flowering plant family Orchidaceae.

Orchid may also refer to:

Persons
 Orchid I. Jordan (1910–1995), American politician

Places
 Orchid, Florida, United States
 Orchid, Missouri, United States
 Orchid, Virginia, United States

Fictional locations
 The Orchid, a Dharma Initiative research station on the TV series Lost

Entertainment

Literature
 The Orchid (novel), a 1905 novel by Robert Grant
The Orchid, a 1931 novel by Robert Nathan
The Orchid, a 1975 photography book by Takashi Kijima
Orchid, a comic book series by American musician Tom Morello

Film, TV and theatre
 The Orchid, a 1903 musical play
 The Orchid (film), a 1951 Argentine drama film
 “Little Women,korean drama,2022

Music

Groups and bands
 Orchid (hardcore punk band), a band from Massachusetts active between 1997 and 2002
 Orchid (heavy metal band), a band from California active since 2007
 The Orchids, a Scottish pop group

Albums
 Orchid (album), the debut album of the progressive metal and progressive rock band Opeth
 Orchids (album), the debut album of dream pop band Astral

Songs
 "Orchid," a song by Black Sabbath on the album Master of Reality
 "Orchid," a song by Alanis Morissette on the album Flavors of Entanglement
 "Orchid," a song by Erra on the album Drift
 "Orchids," a song by Stone Sour on the album Stone Sour

Organisations, groups, companies
 Orchid Technology, a technology company
 Orchid Chemicals & Pharmaceuticals, an Indian pharmaceutical firm
 Orchid (charity), a cancer research organization

Other uses
 Orchid (color), a bright rich purple color

See also

 Black orchid (disambiguation)
 
 Orchard (disambiguation)
 ORCID, Open Researcher and Contributor ID
 Ohrid (disambiguation)